Grand Forks was a town in Shoshone County, Idaho which was destroyed by the Great Fire of 1910.  Its site was listed on the National Register of Historic Places in 1984.

It once flourished as a railway town.  The site is little-changed since the town was burned.  It was deemed "significant as an area that was not reoccupied or altered after that disaster."

It is located east of Avery, Idaho.

References

1910 disestablishments in Idaho
Former populated places in Idaho
National Register of Historic Places in Shoshone County, Idaho
Populated places disestablished in 1910
Populated places in Shoshone County, Idaho